Kurtziella serga is a species of sea snail, a marine gastropod mollusk in the family Mangeliidae.

Description
The length of the shell attains , its diameter .

The small, dull, slender shell is yellowish white. It contains 8 whorls. The protoconch is small, translucent and shining. It passes into the sculpture of the adult gradually, in 2½ nuclear whorls, which show first minute transverse wrinkles on the periphery of the second whorl. The succeeding whorls are transversely sculptured by eight to twelve slightly oblique angular riblets, which pass entirely over the whorls, and only become obsolete on the siphonal canal. These are crossed, first by (on the upper whorls) two or (on the body whorl) nine rounded threads which rise to sharp points on reaching the summits of the riblets, and are perfectly distinct in the interspaces. Secondly, by finer intercalary revolving threads, which pass without change over the riblets, usually to the number of three or four between each pair of primary threads. These also cover the notch-band, and over them, as well as the primaries, the lines of growth are raised in microscopic granules, or lamella, which, under strong magnification, give a very peculiar scabrous appearance to the surface. The strongest primary riblet is the one just in advance of the somewhat steeply declining and poorly defined notchband. The aperture is narrow. The anal sinus is deep. The outer lip is thin, produced and probably thickened in the perfectly mature adult. The columella and body whorl show no callus. The columella is straight. The suture is appressed. The siphonal canal is slightly recurved.

Distribution
K. serga can be found in Atlantic waters, in the Gulf Stream ranging from Bermuda to Brazil.; in the Caribbean Sea and in the Gulf of Mexico.

Fossils have been found in Quaternary strata of Louisiana, USA.

References

 G., F. Moretzsohn, and E. F. García. 2009. Gastropoda (Mollusca) of the Gulf of Mexico, Pp. 579–699 in Felder, D.L. and D.K. Camp (eds.), Gulf of Mexico–Origins, Waters, and Biota. Biodiversity. Texas A&M Press, College Station, Texas

External links
  Serge GOFAS, Ángel A. LUQUE, Joan Daniel OLIVER,José TEMPLADO & Alberto SERRA (2021) - The Mollusca of Galicia Bank (NE Atlantic Ocean); European Journal of Taxonomy 785: 1–114

 Tucker, J.K. 2004 Catalog of recent and fossil turrids (Mollusca: Gastropoda). Zootaxa 682:1–1295.

serga
Gastropods described in 1881
Taxa named by William Healey Dall